Harry H. Raymond (born as Harry H. Truman, February 20, 1862 – March 21, 1925), nicknamed "Jack", was a Major League Baseball player who played infielder from -. He would play for the Louisville Colonels, Washington Senators, and Pittsburgh Pirates.

External links

1862 births
1925 deaths
Major League Baseball infielders
Washington Senators (1891–1899) players
Pittsburgh Pirates players
Louisville Colonels players
19th-century baseball players
Minor league baseball managers
Emporia Reds players
Leavenworth Soldiers players
Kansas City Cowboys (minor league) players
San Antonio Missionaries players
San Antonio Cowboys players
Austin Senators players
San Antonio (minor league baseball) players
Sioux City Corn Huskers players
Phillipsburg Burgers players
Spokane Bunchgrassers players
Montgomery Colts players
Binghamton Bingoes players
Allentown Buffaloes players
Detroit Creams players
Detroit Tigers (Western League) players
Dubuque (minor league baseball) players
Syracuse Stars (minor league baseball) players
Rochester Blackbirds players
Newark Colts players
Reading Actives players
Utica Pent Ups players
Utica Pentups players
Schenectady Electricians players